Jamie Wong Wan-Yiu (born 4 November 1986) is a Hong Kong cyclist.

She was second in the Asian Cycling Championships in 2007 in Thailand. A year later she won the points race at the 2007–08 Track Cycling World Cup in Copenhagen.

2010 Asian Games
At the 2010 Asian Games, she won the silver medal in the points race in the cycling competition in dramatic fashion, after taking a fall early in the race and fracturing a rib. Wong had to be helped up to the podium to collect her medal and sobbed uncontrollably as she shakily stood for the national anthem, clutching her arm and her knees clearly badly bruised and grazed. Wong was taken from the velodrome in a wheelchair. Her coach Shen Jia-Kang said it was a miracle that she finished the race. The day after winning the silver medal, Wong said: "I learnt to be brave from my tough mother. She worked hard and saved money to buy me a bike after learning I was interested in cycling."

After claiming her silver medal, Hong Kong's Chief Executive Donald Tsang and Secretary for Home Affairs Tsang Tak-sing wished her and her teammate Diao Xiaojuan a speedy recovery from their injuries.

2012 London Olympics
Jamie Wong competed in the Women's road race at the 2012 London Olympics alongside 65 other riders, and finished the 140-kilometre course in nearly 3 hours and 57 minutes under adverse weather conditions. She came last out of the 59 riders who finished the race, was some 21 minutes behind Dutch winner Marianne Vos. Wong said she was disappointed she couldn't keep up with the main pack.

2013 Asian Cycling Championship
In March 2013, Jamie Wong successfully defended her title when she won the 20 km points race in the 2013 Asian Cycling Championships at New Delhi, by scoring 41 marks after 80 rounds, beating her Japanese and Malaysian rivals.

Personal life
Jamie's father is Wong Man-shing. Jamie was five years old when her parents divorced.

Major results
2008
1st Points Race, Launceston Carnival
3rd Points Race, International Track Challenge Vienna  
2013
ACC Track Asia Cup – Thailand Round
1st Individual Pursuit
1st Points Race
2014
Hong Kong International Track Cup
1st Individual Pursuit
1st Points Race
1st Team Pursuit (with Meng Zhaojuan, Pang Yao and Yang Qianyu)
Track Asia Cup
1st Individual Pursuit
1st Points Race
3rd Team Pursuit, Asian Track Championships (with Pang Yao, Meng Zhaojuan and Yang Qianyu)

References

External links
Personal profile at Hong Kong Olympic Council

1986 births
Hong Kong track cyclists
Hong Kong female cyclists
Living people
Cyclists at the 2012 Summer Olympics
Olympic cyclists of Hong Kong
Asian Games medalists in cycling
Cyclists at the 2006 Asian Games
Cyclists at the 2010 Asian Games
Cyclists at the 2014 Asian Games
Asian Games silver medalists for Hong Kong
Asian Games bronze medalists for Hong Kong
Medalists at the 2010 Asian Games
Medalists at the 2014 Asian Games